N-Pyrrolidyllysergamide (LPD-824) is a derivative of ergine. It is reported to have some mild, short lasting LSD-like effects at a dose of 800 micrograms.

References

Lysergamides
Pyrrolidines
Serotonin receptor agonists